Juan Bautista Egusquiza Isasi (25 August 1845, Asunción – 24 August 1902) was President of Paraguay from 25 November 1894 to 25 November 1898. He was elected to one four-year term as were most presidents of Paraguay of his era. He was a member of the Colorado Party.

References

1845 births
1902 deaths
People from Asunción
Presidents of Paraguay
Paraguayan people of Basque descent
Colorado Party (Paraguay) politicians